Choe Kum-Chol (Chosŏn'gŭl: 최금철; Hanja: 崔金哲; born 9 February 1987) is a former North Korean international football player who last played for Nakhonnayok in Thailand's Regional League Division 2 on loan from Muangthong United.

Choe has made eight appearances for the Korea DPR national football team in 2010 FIFA World Cup qualifying matches.

Goals for senior national team

References

External links 
 

1987 births
Living people
Sportspeople from Pyongyang
North Korean footballers
North Korea international footballers
Rimyongsu Sports Club players
2010 FIFA World Cup players
2011 AFC Asian Cup players
Footballers at the 2010 Asian Games
North Korean expatriate sportspeople in Thailand

Association football forwards
Asian Games competitors for North Korea